The Forty-Eighth Wisconsin Legislature convened from  to  in regular session.  During this term, legislative business was largely held in the north wing of the Wisconsin State Capitol, which was the only part of the capitol to remain intact after the 1904 fire.

This session saw the first ever African American member of the Wisconsin Legislature—Lucian H. Palmer of Milwaukee.

Senators representing odd-numbered districts were newly elected for this session and were serving the first two years of a four-year term. Assembly members were elected to a two-year term. Assembly members and odd-numbered senators were elected in the general election of November 6, 1906. Senators representing even-numbered districts were serving the third and fourth year of a four-year term, having been elected in the general election of November 8, 1904.

Major events
 February 15, 1907: The Gentlemen's Agreement of 1907 was reached between representatives of the United States and the Empire of Japan, in which Japan would restrict emigration to the U.S., and the U.S. would stop imposing restrictions on Japanese immigrants.
 February 16, 1907: George E. Bryant, the incumbent Wisconsin Superintendent of Public Property, died in office.
 March 3, 1907: John Coit Spooner, Wisconsin's influential senior United States senator, unexpectedly announced his resignation from office, effective May 1.
 May 17, 1907: After a long and contentious nominating process in the Republican caucus, Isaac Stephenson was elected United States Senator by the Wisconsin Legislature in joint session to fill the remainder of John C. Spooner's term.
 July 3, 1907: A tornado struck Neillsville, Wisconsin, resulting in at least 15 deaths.
 October 24, 1907: A major U.S. financial crisis was averted by a group of Wall Street financiers who pooled $25,000,000 to prop up failing stocks during the Panic of 1907.
 December 30, 1907: Wisconsin Supreme Court chief justice John B. Cassoday died in office.  He was immediately succeeded, as chief justice, by John B. Winslow, due to the rule of seniority.  
 January 8, 1908: Robert McKee Bashford was appointed to the Wisconsin Supreme Court by Governor James O. Davidson, to replace the deceased justice John B. Cassoday for the remainder of the 1907–1908 court term.
 April 7, 1908: John Barnes defeated the recently-appointed Robert McKee Bashford in the Wisconsin Supreme Court election to fill the seat of deceased justice John B. Cassoday, for the term beginning July 1, 1908.
 June 30, 1908: An asteroid or comet exploded in the air near the Podkamennaya Tunguska in Russia.  Known as the Tunguska event, it was the largest impact event on Earth in recorded history.
 November 3, 1908: 1908 United States general election:
 William Howard Taft elected President of the United States.
 James O. Davidson re-elected Governor of Wisconsin.
 Voters approved an amendment to the Wisconsin constitution to limit voting rights to only U.S. citizens.
 Voters approved an amendment to the Wisconsin constitution to limit the time allowed for gubernatorial vetoes.
 Voters approved an amendment to the Wisconsin constitution to allow the state to implement an income tax.
 Voters approved an amendment to the Wisconsin constitution to allow the state to implement a highway funding mechanism.

Major legislation
 Joint Resolution to amend section 10, article V, of the constitution, relating to the approval of bills by the governor, 1907 Joint Resolution 13.  Second legislative approval of the constitutional amendment to limit the time allowed for a gubernatorial veto.  This amendment was then ratified by voters in the 1908 fall general election.
 Joint Resolution providing for an amendment to section 10, article VIII of the constitution, relating to internal improvements, 1907 Joint Resolution 18.  Second legislative approval of the constitutional amendment to authorize the state to fund highway construction.  This amendment was also ratified in the 1908 fall general election.
 Joint Resolution to amend section 3 of article X of the constitution, relating to the school age of children, 1907 Joint Resolution 23. Proposed an amendment to the state constitution to make public school cover children from age six to 20.
 Joint Resolution to amend section 1 of article III of the constitution, relating to electors, 1907 Joint Resolution 25.  Second legislative approval of the constitutional amendment to limit voting rights to only U.S. citizens.  This amendment was also ratified in the 1908 fall general election.
 Joint Resolution 28, 1907 Joint Resolution 28.  Reiterating Wisconsin's call for an amendment to the U.S. constitution for direct election of U.S. senators.
 Joint Resolution 29, 1907 Joint Resolution 29.  Second legislative approval of the constitutional amendment to authorize a state income tax.  This amendment was also ratified in the 1908 fall general election.
 Joint Resolution providing an amendment to section 3 of article IV, ox the constitution of the state of Wisconsin, relating to apportionment, 1907 Joint Resolution 30.  Proposing an amendment to the state constitution to make redistricting a once-per-decade process following the release of the decennial U.S. census.  U to this time, Wisconsin had conducted redistricting twice per decade.
 Joint Resolution to amend section 10 of article VIII of the constitution, 1907 Joint Resolution 31.  Proposed an amendment to the state constitution to allow the state to more directly invest in certain public works projects.
 Joint Resolution to amend section 21 of article IV of the constitution, relating to the compensation of members of the legislature, 1907 Joint Resolution 35.  Proposing an amendment to the state constitution to double the compensation for legislators.

Party summary

Senate summary

Assembly summary

Sessions
 1st Regular session: January 9, 1907July 16, 1907

Leaders

Senate leadership
 President of the Senate: William D. Connor (R)
 President pro tempore: James Huff Stout (R–Menomonie)

Assembly leadership
 Speaker of the Assembly: Herman Ekern (R–Whitehall)

Members

Members of the Senate
Members of the Senate for the Forty-Eighth Wisconsin Legislature:

Members of the Assembly
Members of the Assembly for the Forty-Eighth Wisconsin Legislature:

Committees

Senate committees
 Senate Committee on AgricultureWolff, chair
 Senate Committee on Banks and InsuranceJ. E. Roehr, chair
 Senate Committee on EducationJ. H. Stout, chair
 Senate Committee on ElectionsMartin, chair
 Senate Committee on Engrossed BillsLockney, chair
 Senate Committee on Federal RelationsStondall, chair
 Senate Committee on the JudiciarySanborn, chair
 Senate Committee on Legislative Expenditures and EmployeesMorris, chair
 Senate Committee on Manufacturers and LaborFroemming, chair
 Senate Committee on Military AffairsFairchild, chair
 Senate Committee on Public HealthNoble, chair
 Senate Committee on Roads and BridgesBrowne, chair
 Senate Committee on State AffairsMunson, chair
 Senate Committee on TaxationWilcox, chair
 Senate Committee on Towns and CountiesBarker, chair
 Senate Committee on TransportationHudnall, chair
 Senate Committee on Villages and CitiesWright, chair

Assembly committees
 Assembly Committee on AgricultureJ. A. Fridd, chair
 Assembly Committee on Banks and InsuranceG. E. Scott, chair
 Assembly Committee on CitiesC. E. Estabrook, chair
 Assembly Committee on Dairy and FoodJ. A. McKenzie, chair
 Assembly Committee on DamsE. F. Nelson, chair
 Assembly Committee on EducationD. McGregor, chair
 Assembly Committee on ElectionsT. A. Roycraft, chair
 Assembly Committee on Engrossed BillsL. N. Clausen, chair
 Assembly Committee on Federal RelationsA. J. Jerdee, chair
 Assembly Committee on the JudiciaryC. A. Ingram, chair
 Assembly Committee on LibrariesL. Ledvina, chair
 Assembly Committee on Legislative Expenditures and EmployeesF. J. Kimball, chair
 Assembly Committee on Lumber and MiningF. J. Carpenter, chair
 Assembly Committee on Manufactures and LaborW. H. Bell, chair
 Assembly Committee on Military AffairsW. M. Perry, chair
 Assembly Committee on Public HealthW. Irvine, chair
 Assembly Committee on Public ImprovementsC. J. Hagen, chair
 Assembly Committee on Roads and BridgesP. Norcross, chair
 Assembly Committee on State AffairsW. R. Turner, chair
 Assembly Committee on the State FairJ. D. Harring, chair
 Assembly Committee on TaxationE. H. Sprague, chair
 Assembly Committee on Third ReadingH. E. Roethe, chair
 Assembly Committee on Towns and CountiesW. H. Falvey, chair
 Assembly Committee on TransportationE. W. LeRoy, chair
 Assembly Committee on VillagesD. F. Mains, chair

Joint committees
 Joint Committee on the CapitolWhitehead (Sen.) & A. S. Baker (Asm.), co-chairs
 Joint Committee on Charitable and Penal InstitutionsHagemeister(Sen.) & J. O. Thomas (Asm.), co-chairs
 Joint Committee on ClaimsBurns (Sen.) & R. Ainsworth (Asm.), co-chairs
 Joint Committee on Enrolled BillsMarsh (Sen.) & F. Ties (Asm.), co-chairs
 Joint Committee on Fish and GamePage (Sen.) & E. A. Everett (Asm.), co-chairs
 Joint Committee on ForestryBird (Sen.) & W. M. Curtiss (Asm.), co-chairs
 Joint Committee on PrintingOwen (Sen.) & V. S. Keppel (Asm.), co-chairs
 Joint Committee on RevisionBrazeau (Sen.) & C. F. Stout (Asm.), co-chairs
 Joint Committee on RulesStout (Sen.) & D. McGregor (Asm.), co-chairs
 Joint Committee on State DepartmentsFridd (Sen.) & A. Kuckuk (Asm.), co-chairs
 Special Joint Committee on ApportionmentWhitehead (Sen.) & R. J. Nye (Asm.), co-chairs

Employees

Senate employees
 Chief Clerk: A. R. Emerson
 Journal Clerk: R. E. Smith
 Assistant Journal Clerk: William Gray
 Bookkeeper: Fred M. Wylie
 Engrossing Clerk: J. C. Miller
 Index Clerk: C. W. Rhodes
 Stenographer Clerks:
 R. R. Hillyer
 A. W. Galloway
 C. R. Welton
 T. H. Jones
 F. W. Spencer
 J. H. Sapiro
 A. C. Tretow
 D. W. Swartz
 John Bessey
 Typewriter Clerks:
 R. A. Merrill
 L. B. Webster
 O. P. Peterson
 C. E. Rightor
 W. T. Kelsey
 Max Schoetz
 Sergeant-at-Arms: Russell C. Falconer
 Assistant Sergeant-at-Arms: Charles Good
 Document Clerk: Elmer Pierce
 Police: Olaf Goldsbrand
 Night Watch: M. R. Stanley
 Night Laborer: K. Thompson
 Postmaster: Christoph Paulus
 Messengers: 
 Vincent Kalpinski
 Emil C. Cady
 John W. Moffatt
 Harold M. Lampert
 Karl Helmholz
 Matthew Button
 J. W. Damm
 Harry Cotey

Assembly employees
 Chief Clerk: C. E. Shaffer
 Journal Clerk: W. W. Jones
 Assistant Journal Clerk: G. H. Kiland
 Bookkeeper: S. S. Summers
 General Clerk: J. E. Noyes (later I. R. Nash)
 2nd General Clerk: W. J. Goldschmidt
 Enrolling Clerk: R. E. Knoff
 Engrossing Clerk: N. J. Frey
 Index Clerk: William L. Bullock
 Stenographers:
 G. W. Stevens
 Burton L. Warriner
 L. T. Pond
 March Polk
 A. J. Nelson
 C. A. Nickerson
 Leon Lewis
 P. H. Presentin
 James McNeeley
 L. P. Larson
 A. T. Twesme
 Typewriters:
 C. M. Gillett
 L. L. Oeland
 D. E. Mowry
 J. C. Hawker
 H. C. Hopson
 Wendell Woodruff
 P. L. Priest
 Sergeant-at-Arms: William S. Irvine
 Assistant Sergeant-at-Arms: H. A. Graham
 Document Clerk: A. H. Bartlett
 Assistant Document Clerk: A. E. Hart
 Police: John Steele
 Night Watch: Obert Sletton
 Night Laborers:
 John Curtin
 H. G. Hart
 Postmaster: John Harris
 Assistant Postmaster: J. R. Snyder
 Messengers:
 Ed. S. Malone
 Helmer Femrite
 A. W. Prehn
 Lyman Keyes
 Frank Hagen
 W. W. Studeman
 J. W. Gaurke
 Selmer Gunderson
 H. W. Kellar
 Walter Reif
 C. T. Puls
 E. S. Polley

References

External links
 1907: Related Documents from Wisconsin Legislature

1907 in Wisconsin
1908 in Wisconsin
Wisconsin
Wisconsin legislative sessions